The Generation of '36  is the name given to a group of Spanish artists, poets and playwrights who were working about the time of the Spanish Civil War (1936 - 1939).

The Generation of '36 was a literary movement that suffered harsh criticism and persecution that followed from the division of neighbours into winners and losers in the various battles of that struggle, as well as from the physical hardships and moral miseries arising from social instability and political chaos. 

Ricardo Gullón listed some of the authors associated with this movement since he was closely associated as a contributor and a literary critic of the genre.

The Generation of '36 had membership criteria that were not rigid, but the label provides a convenient portfolio of the cultural and literary style of the contemporary period, covering individual works, literary collections, magazines, journals newspapers and other publications that document the experiences of creative people working during the difficult and frightening civil war.

Poets
The poets of Generación del 36 include:

 Miguel Hernández
 Luis Rosales
 Leopoldo Panero and Juan Panero
 Luis Felipe Vivanco
 Ildefonso-Manuel Gil
 Germán Bleiberg
 José Antonio Muñoz Rojas
 José María Luelmo
 Pedro Pérez Clotet
 Ángela Figuera Aymerich
 Rafael Duyos
 Celso Amieva
 Gabriel Celaya
 Arturo Serrano Plaja
 José Herrera Petere
 Juan Gil-Albert

Writers
The writers of prose included in Generación del 36:

 Enrique Azcoaga
 José Antonio Maravall
 Antonio Sánchez Barbudo
 Ramón Faraldo
 Eusebio García Luengo
 María Zambrano
 Antonio Rodríguez Moñino
 José Ferrater Mora
 Ricardo Gullón

Raconteurs
Famous Generación del 36 raconteurs:
 Camilo José Cela
 Gonzalo Torrente Ballester
 Miguel Delibes

Dramatists and playwrights
Performance works of the epoch included Antonio Buero Vallejo.

Important contributors
Others who started working at the end or after the Civil War include the Garcilasismo group and:

 Dionisio Ridruejo
 José Luis Cano
 Ramón de Garciasol
 Pedro Laín Entralgo
 Juan López Morillas
 José Luis Aranguren
 Julián Marías
 Juan Rof Carballo
 Segundo Serrano Poncela
 Juan Antonio Gaya Nuño
 José Suárez Carreño
 Jorge Campos (writer)
 Ernesto Guerra da Cal
 José Manuel Blecua

See also
 Generation of '27

References

Spanish literary movements
Spanish Civil War
Cultural history of Spain
Cultural generations